The 1974 Upper Voltan coup d'état was a bloodless military coup which took place in the Republic of Upper Volta on 8 February 1974.

The coup was effectively a self-coup, orchestrated by President General Sangoulé Lamizana (in office since the 1966 coup), against the RDA-led government of Prime Minister Gérard Kango Ouédraogo, formed following the 1970 parliamentary election.

Lamizana announced the dissolution of the National Assembly and the suspension of the Constitution, adopted following the 1970 constitutional referendum. He subsequently appointed himself as the new Prime Minister, in a government comprising 11 military officers and 4 civilians.

See also
History of Burkina Faso

References

1974 in Upper Volta
Upper Volta
Upper Volta
Military coups in Burkina Faso
February 1974 events in Africa